Sadid Industrial Group was established in 1963 in Iran. It is an industrial conglomerate in the fields of designing, engineering and fabrication of machines/equipment, production of spiral and longitudinal welded steel pipes, general contracting of oil, gas and petrochemical projects, water and sewage utilities and manufacturing of wind power generators.

See also
Energy in Iran
National Iranian Oil Company

References

External links
Company's website

Manufacturing companies of Iran
Construction and civil engineering companies established in 1963
Iranian entities subject to the U.S. Department of the Treasury sanctions
Manufacturing companies established in 1963
1963 establishments in Iran